Lothar Krieg (born 10 December 1955) was a West German athlete who competed mainly in the 400 metres.

He competed for West Germany in the 1976 Summer Olympics held in Montreal, Quebec, Canada in the 4 x 400 metre relay where he won the bronze medal with his teammates Franz-Peter Hofmeister, Harald Schmid and Bernd Herrmann.

References

Sports Reference

1955 births
West German male sprinters
Olympic bronze medalists for West Germany
Athletes (track and field) at the 1976 Summer Olympics
Olympic athletes of West Germany
Living people
Medalists at the 1976 Summer Olympics
Olympic bronze medalists in athletics (track and field)
Universiade medalists in athletics (track and field)
Universiade bronze medalists for West Germany